Catherine of Hungary (July 1370 – May 1378), a member of the Capetian House of Anjou, was heir presumptive to the thrones of Hungary and Poland as eldest child of King Louis the Great and his second wife, Elizabeth of Bosnia.

Heir presumptive
Catherine's birth was long expected, as her parents, Louis I of Hungary and Elizabeth of Bosnia, were childless for the first seventeen years of their marriage. Her birth also secured the succession to the Holy Crown of Hungary, to which Catherine was heir presumptive all her life.

Being the eldest daughter of the King of Hungary and Poland who had no sons, Catherine was a much wanted bride. When she was only four years old, she was betrothed to Louis, a younger son of King Charles V of France and future Duke of Orléans. Their marriage was supposed to establish a connection between the two branches of the French royal house. Her father made a set of concessions to the Polish noblemen in exchange for recognizing Catherine (or one of her sisters) as sovereign of Poland after his death. This agreement is known as the Privilege of Koszyce.

Thus, Catherine was expected to reign over Hungary and Poland. Her father also planned to leave her his claim to the Crown of Naples and the County of Provence, which were then held by his ailing and childless cousin Joanna I. She was supposed to be married to Louis upon reaching marriageable age, and he would retain the rights to Naples even if the marriage were childless and Catherine were to predecease him, while Provence would become a hereditary fiefdom of the House of Valois. The King of France asked Catherine's father to have Catherine recognised as heir presumptive to the Holy Crown of Hungary; although Provence was important to Charles, establishing a cadet branch of the House of Valois on the Hungarian throne was also significant, as Catherine's prospect of becoming queen of Naples was not realistic.

Death and aftermath
However, Catherine died at the age of seven, predeceasing both her father and her cousin Joanna. The agreement between her father and the noblemen became null and void. Catherine's youngest sister Jadwiga eventually became monarch of Poland. Her other sister Mary, who was betrothed to her fiancé, became heir presumptive and eventually monarch of Hungary.

Ancestors

See also
 Elizabeth of Slavonia (Catherine's cousin and predecessor as heiress of Hungary)
 Chest of Saint Simeon

Notes
 There may have been a daughter named Mary who died in infancy in 1366, but whether or not she existed is unclear.

References

1370 births
1378 deaths
House of Anjou-Hungary
Hungarian princesses
Polish princesses
14th-century Hungarian people
14th-century Hungarian women
People of Byzantine descent
Daughters of kings
Royalty and nobility who died as children